Sudbury railway station was a railway station serving Sudbury, Derbyshire although the station was located in Staffordshire, near to Draycott in the Clay.

The station was opened by the North Staffordshire Railway in 1848 and in 1862 it was also served by Great Northern Railway on the route between Stafford and Grantham.

The platforms today have been removed but the railway cottages and signal box are still in use, Trains on the Crewe to Derby Line still pass through the former station.

References

Further reading

Disused railway stations in Staffordshire
Railway stations in Great Britain opened in 1848
Railway stations in Great Britain closed in 1966
Former North Staffordshire Railway stations